The 1963 Winnipeg municipal election was held on October 23, 1963 to determine mayors, councillors and school trustees in the City of Winnipeg and its suburban communities.  There were also referendum votes in some communities.  There was no mayoral election in Winnipeg.

Results

Winnipeg

Mark Danzker, David Mulligan and Edith Tennant were elected to Winnipeg City Council for the city's first ward.  Lloyd Stinson, Terry Hind and William McGarva were elected for the second ward.  Slaw Rebchuk, Joseph Zuken and Donovan Swailes were elected for the third ward.

St. Vital

Municipal elections in Winnipeg
1963 in Manitoba
October 1963 events in Canada
Winnipeg